Alfred John Crook (November 20, 1897 – February 17, 1958) was an American football player.  He played professionally in the National Football League (NFL) for the Detroit Panthers from 1925 to 1926. Crook attended Washington & Jefferson College and was the starting center and defensive end for the Presidents in the 1922 Rose Bowl. His nickname "Monk" was given to him by his teammates at Washington & Jefferson.

References

External links
 

1897 births
1958 deaths
American football centers
American football guards
American football tackles
Detroit Panthers players
Washington & Jefferson Presidents football players
Players of American football from Detroit